Jessica Rose Brown Findlay (born 14 September 1987) is an English actress. She played Lady Sybil Crawley in the ITV television period drama series Downton Abbey and Emelia Conan Doyle in the 2011 British comedy-drama feature film Albatross.

In 2014, she appeared as Beverly Penn in the film adaptation of the Mark Helprin novel Winter's Tale. In 2015, she co-starred in Paul McGuigan's Victor Frankenstein as Lorelei, the Esmerelda-like acrobat. In 2016, she joined the cast of the biopic feature film, England is Mine, about the early life and career of English singer Morrissey, who co-founded the indie rock band The Smiths.

Brown Findlay portrayed Charlotte Wells, a madam's daughter and sex worker, in the three series run of Harlots (2017–2019), a period drama television series initially screening on ITV Encore in the UK and on Hulu Plus in the US. In 2020, she was in the main cast of the series Brave New World.

Early life
Brown Findlay grew up in Cookham, Berkshire. Her father is a financial adviser and her mother is a teaching assistant. She told Vanity Fair in 2012, "I grew up there, as did my Mum. My Nan and Granddad are around the corner. It is a very familiar place and incredibly dear to my heart. It's sort of quiet, but wonderfully so."

She trained with the National Youth Ballet and the Associates of the Royal Ballet, and at age 15 was invited to dance with the Kirov at the Royal Opera House for a summer season. She attended Furze Platt Senior School in Maidenhead. At the end of her GCSEs, she was accepted to a number of ballet schools, but chose to attend the Arts Educational School for the A-level courses it provided and its pastoral care. She was there for two years. In the second, she had three operations on her ankles, the last of which went wrong, preventing her from continuing as a dancer.

After encouragement from an art teacher, she finished her education at Arts Educational School, Tring Park, then moved on to a fine art course at Central Saint Martin's College of Art and Design. In a 2012 interview with Vanity Fair, she said, "Growing up, I was completely in love and infatuated with ballet. Ballet was my life completely." She subsequently attended university in London, where she discovered the stage. She said, "Acting was the element from ballet that I actually loved and missed the most."

Career
Brown Findlay was cast in the lead role of 17-year-old Emilia Conan Doyle for Albatross, a 2011 British coming-of-age comedy drama film directed by Niall MacCormick, co-starring Julia Ormond, Felicity Jones and Sebastian Koch. Its premise is a teenage aspiring writer entering the lives of a dysfunctional family on the south coast of England, with bookish young women meeting up with a peer who lacks any boundaries or inhibitions. She was next cast in two episodes of the British science fiction comedy-drama television show Misfits, where she appeared in the first-season finale as a wholesome religious girl whose superpower is convincing everyone to abandon their delinquent behaviour in favour of celibacy.

Almost immediately after her work in Albatross, Brown Findlay was cast in the ITV period drama television series Downton Abbey as Lady Sybil Crawley, the youngest and most forward-thinking of the Grantham daughters. In a 2012 interview with Vanity Fair, she said, "I thought this character of Sybil was fascinating, and I liked her modern attitude to life." She was the second major cast member to leave the series when her character died from eclampsia after giving birth in the third series. During a 2015 interview, Downton Abbey creator Julian Fellowes discussed the plot twist: "Jessica Brown Findlay, who played Sybil, had said she was going to leave right from the beginning. She said, 'I'm doing three years, then I'm leaving.' So that was all worked out."

She next appeared as Abi in the Black Mirror episode "Fifteen Million Merits" with English actor Daniel Kaluuya.   The episode imagined a dystopian future where people earn merits on exercise bikes and the only way to escape their slave-like existence is to audition for reality TV judges.

In 2012, Brown Findlay became the face of the Dominic Jones jewellery line. She was cast in Not Another Happy Ending by John McKay, and in the miniseries Labyrinth, based on the novel of the same name by Kate Mosse, portraying Alaïs Pelletier. In 2012, she was cast as Beverly Penn in the film adaptation of the novel Winter's Tale (2014) with Colin Farrell and Russell Crowe.

In July 2015, she played emotionally conflicted stepmother Alice Aldridge in The Outcast, the BBC's two-part television adaptation of Sadie Jones’ novel.

In May 2015, Brown Findlay made her professional theatre debut at the Almeida Theatre,  London, as Electra in a new adaptation of The Oresteia, to positive reviews. The production subsequently moved to the Trafalgar Theatre in London's West End. Writer/director Robert Icke cast Brown Findlay in his production of Uncle Vanya at the same venue in February the following year.

In September 2016, it was announced that Brown Findlay would play Ophelia in a new production of Hamlet at the Almeida Theatre in London. The production was critically acclaimed and also later moved to the West End, where it ran until September 2017 with award-winning "Sherlock" and "Fleabag" actor Andrew Scott as Hamlet.

In 2016, Brown Findlay joined the cast of a biopic feature film initially entitled Steven, about the early life and career of English singer Morrissey, who co-founded the indie rock band The Smiths.  The film, renamed England is Mine, premiered at the Edinburgh Film Festival in 2017, with Dunkirk actor Jack Lowden in the lead role.

Brown Findlay starred as Bella Brown in This Beautiful Fantastic,  a 2016 British romantic drama film directed and written by Simon Aboud as a repressed foundling who forms a new life through her relationships with a curmudgeonly neighbour (Tom Wilkinson), a gifted cook (Andrew Scott) and an eccentric inventor (Jeremy Irvine).

In 2017, Brown Findlay portrayed Charlotte Wells, a brothel owner's daughter and famed courtesan, in Harlots, a period drama television series created by Alison Newman and Moira Buffini, and inspired by "The Covent Garden Ladies" by Hallie Rubenhold. It premiered on 27 March 2017 on ITV Encore in the UK and on 29 March 2017 on Hulu Plus in the US. It focuses on Margaret Wells, who runs a brothel in 18th century England and struggles to raise her daughters in a chaotic household.  Also in 2017, Brown Findlay voiced the character of Fay in the animated film Monster Family.

In 2018, she starred as Elizabeth McKenna in The Guernsey Literary and Potato Peel Pie Society.

In May 2019, it was announced that she would star as Lenina Crowne in the NBCUniversal series Brave New World, based on the classic 1932 novel by Aldous Huxley. It was subsequently moved to the Peacock network.

In 2021, she starred as Pamela Legat in the Netflix film Munich: The Edge of War, describing events in Britain and Germany prior to the start of World War II.

Personal life
Brown Findlay began dating actor Ziggy Heath in late 2016. They married on 12 September 2020. On 5 November 2022, their twin sons were born.

Filmography

Film

Television

Theatre

Awards and nominations

References

External links
 

Living people
21st-century English actresses
Actresses from Berkshire
Alumni of Central Saint Martins
English film actresses
English stage actresses
English television actresses
People educated at Tring Park School for the Performing Arts
People from Cookham
1987 births